is a city located in the southern part of Okinawa Island in Okinawa Prefecture, Japan. Translated literally, the name Nanjō means "southern castle". Many castle ruins, called gusuku in the Okinawan language, can be found throughout the city. The modern city of Nanjō was established on January 1, 2006, from the merger of the town of Sashiki, and the villages of Chinen, Ōzato and Tamagusuku (all from Shimajiri District). Nanjō has an area of 49.69 km² and, on the date of its inception, a population of 41,305, and a density of 831.25 per km².

Of the eleven cities in Okinawa Prefecture, Nanjō has the smallest population. It does not have a separate police station nor a high school. For those services, citizens have to refer to the neighbouring towns of Yonabaru and Yaese. The city hosts a fire station responsible for Chinen, Ōzato and Tamagusuku and parts of Yaese, while Sashiki is served by a separate station. The city's main economical activities are agriculture and tourism. Important crops include sugarcane, for sugar and vinegar production, and turmeric, a popular medicinal herb in Okinawa. Several turmeric processing plants are based in the city, producing semi-processed goods to be used by industries on the mainland or consumer products like tea and dietary supplements.

Historical Facts

Shō Hashi lived in Sashiki Castle before uniting the Ryukyu Kingdom.
1908 (Meiji Era, year 41) - By an Imperial Edict, the Magiri system is abolished and the villages of Chinen, Ōzato, Sashiki and Tamagusuku are created.
1945 (Showa Era, year 20) - After the Battle of Okinawa, Chinen is given the status of city by the occupying American Army. In the following year, it reverts to being a village.
1949 (Showa Era, year 24) - The districts (字) of Yonabaru, Ueyonabaru and Itarashiki are severed from the village of Ōzato to form the new village of Yonabaru.
1980 (Showa Era, year 55) - Sashiki receives the status of town.
2005 (Heisei Era, year 17), March - The name Nanjō-shi was selected for the soon to be founded city.
2006 (Heisei Era, year 18), January 1 - Foundation of the city of Nanjō.

Geography
Nanjō is a city located in the southern region of Okinawa's main island. The isle of Kudaka, off the coast of Chinen, also belongs to the city.

Districts/Localities
Chinen (知念)
 Azama (安座真) 
 Umino (海野) 
 Gushiken (具志堅) 
 Kudaka (久高) 
 Kudeken (久手堅) 
 Kuhara (久原) 
 Shikiya (志喜屋) 
 China (知名) 
 Chinen (知念) 
 Yamazato (山里) 
 Yoshitomi (吉富)
 Ōzato (大里) 
 Furugen (古堅)  
 Inamine (稲嶺)
 Minei (嶺井)
 Nakama (仲間) 
 Ōzato (大里) 
 Ōshiro (大城) 
 Takahira (高平)
Sashiki (佐敷)
 Fusozaki (富祖崎) 
 Ibara (伊原) 
 Kaneku (兼久)
 Nakaiho (仲伊保)  
 Okoku (小谷) 
 Sashiki (佐敷) 
 Shinkai (新開) 
 Shinzato (新里) 
 Tedokon (手登根)
 Tsuhako (津波古) 
 Yabiku (屋比久)
Tamagusuku (玉城)
 Aichi (愛地) 
 Funakosi (船越) 
 Fusato (富里) 
 Horikawa (堀川) 
 Hyakuna (百名) 
 Itokazu (糸数) 
 Kakinohana (垣花) 
 Kibaru (喜良原)
 Maekawa (前川) 
 Nakayama (中山) 
 Nakandakari (仲村渠) 
 Ō (奥武) 
 Oyakebaru (親慶原) 
 Shikenbaru (志堅原) 
 Tamagusuku (玉城) 
 Tōyama (當山) 
 Yakabu (屋嘉部)

Surrounding Municipalities
Yonabaru
Yaese
Haebaru

Climate

Tourism and Culture

Located in Chinen, the seifa-utaki shrine is listed by UNESCO as part of the Gusuku Sites and Related Properties of the Kingdom of Ryukyu World Heritage Site. It was believed to be a sacred place, from where one could see the "Isle of the Gods". In the shrine, noro priestesses from Shuri Castle would pray for the well-being of the king and the kingdom.

In Tamagusuku, the Gyokusendō cave is known for its stalagmites and stalactites. Discovered in 1967, the cave is estimated to be at least five kilometers long, but only 890 metres are open to tourists. The cave is located inside the Okinawa World cultural theme park. Other attractions of the theme park are the Habu snake museum, native dances such as Eisa, and a traditional Ryūkyū-style village with traditional red-clay roofed houses and workshops for local crafts such as dying and weaving, pottery, and glass blowing.

Also located in Tamagusku, the Itokazu-Abuchiragama cave was used in World War II as a bomb shelter by soldiers and civilians alike. It is also open to tourists. Himeyuri Students were used as nurses in this location among others.

The isle of Kudaka, also called Isle of the Gods, can be accessed from Azama Port, located in Chinen.

From the isle of Ōjima, in Tamagusuku, one can board a glass-bottomed boat, a boat with a transparent floor used in marine-life observations.

Golf is a popular sport in Okinawa, and the Ryūkyū Golf Club in Nanjō has three 27-hole courses. Every spring, the Ryūkyū Golf Club welcomes the Daikin Orchid Ladies Golf Tournament.

The Nanjo Sightseeing Information Center and souvenir shop across the street have cardboard cut-outs of the characters of The Aquatope on White Sand, with the shop including an "entire Aquatope corner."

Gusuku in Nanjō
Chinen Castle
Ōzato Castle
Kakinohana Castle
Sashiki Castle
Tamagusuku Castle

Beaches
Azama Sansan Beach
Hyakuna Beach
Mībaru Beach

Sister cities
 Tamaki, Mie since 1993 
In kanji, Tamaki has the same spelling as Tamagusuku (玉城). Neither name follows the standard readings for the kanji in Japanese.

Access

Passengers traveling from mainland Japan and overseas arrive at Naha Airport. Several bus lines serve the city of Nanjo, departing from the bus terminals at Naha and Itoman.

References

External links

 

Cities in Okinawa Prefecture